The Wimbledon Synagogue (formally, Wimbledon and District Synagogue), a member of the Movement for Reform Judaism, is a synagogue in the London Borough of Wandsworth at Queensmere Road, Wimbledon Park, on the boundary with the London Borough of Merton. Its Rabbi is Adrian Schell and its Chair is Ruth Bragman.

The community was established in 1949 and was based at Worple Road, Wimbledon from 1952 to 1997. In 1997 it moved to its present premises, adapting a 1953 building which previously belonged to Southlands College, now part of the University of Roehampton. The building also houses a Jewish nursery school, Apples and Honey.

The synagogue community has been described in The Jewish Chronicle as particularly welcoming.

History

The synagogue came into being at a meeting of the local Jewish community at the Wimbledon Hill Hotel in February 1949. In its first year the membership, of 60 families, was little more than one-tenth of what it is now. Services were held in temporary accommodation. The community decided to build a new synagogue on a site at 44 Worple Road in Wimbledon. The foundation stone was laid on 8 April 1951 by Ernest Abelson and Leonard Montefiore (of the West London Synagogue) and the synagogue was formally opened and dedicated on 25 May 1952 by Rabbi Dr Leo Baeck. In September 1997 the synagogue moved to its present site, adapting the former Athlone Hall (dating from 1953).

In 1953 the synagogue appointed its first minister, Rabbi Charles Berg. When he retired in 1974, the community had grown to 750 members. He was succeeded by Rabbi Hillel Avidan (1974–1980), Rabbi Daniel Smith (1982–1993), Rabbi Robert Shafritz (1993–1996) who died suddenly in office, Rabbi William Woolf (1997–2002), and  Rabbi Sylvia Rothschild and Rabbi Sybil Sheridan who job shared from 2003 until 2014. Rabbi Jason Rosner was the synagogue's Rabbi from November 2015 to September 2016. Rabbi Tony Hammond became interim part-time Rabbi in 2015 and was reappointed in 2016, serving until the appointment of Rabbi Adrian Schell as the synagogue's full-time Rabbi from November 2020.

Facilities and activities
The synagogue now has 850 members. Services are held every Shabbat on Friday evening and Saturday morning as well as for all Jewish festivals. Services are egalitarian; men and women sit together and take an equal role in the religious life of the community. As well as a cheder and an educational programme for children for young people, the synagogue runs a programme of arts and cultural activities, workshops and lectures.

The synagogue houses three book collections. The David Nathan Library has nearly 2000 books covering Judaism, Israel, history, biography, fiction etc. The Harry Urban Holocaust Library concentrates on the personal stories of survivors of the Shoah. There is also a children's book collection. The collections are catalogued using the Classification System for Libraries of Judaica employed by Leo Baeck College.

The community has a monthly membership newsletter, Kehillah.

The synagogue has three sets of stained glass windows. Their abstract designs were made by Graham Jones with Peters Glass Studio in Germany.

The new acacia wood ark doors, which were part of the 2016 refurbishment, were designed with architect Allan Schwarz, who runs the Mezimbite Forest Center in Mozambique.

Social action
Wimbledon Synagogue is a Fairtrade synagogue and has been involved for many years with the Faith in Action Merton Homeless Project, a charity which works with a range of agencies to support homeless, precariously housed and other marginalised people within the London Borough of Merton. It has also accommodated local homeless people overnight as part of the Merton Night Shelter initiative.

In the media
In 2010 Wimbledon Synagogue hosted the first ever broadcast of BBC Radio 4's Any Questions?  from a synagogue. The programme's broadcast coincided with the 200th anniversary of the first Reform Judaism service.

See also
 List of Jewish communities in the United Kingdom
 Movement for Reform Judaism

References

External links
 Official website
 Wimshul Cooks: Wimbledon Synagogue's Community Cooking Blog
 The Histories of Wimbledon Synagogue 1949–2019 Wimbledon Synagogue, February 2019
Wimbledon & District Synagogue on Jewish Communities and Records – UK (hosted by JewishGen), 5 January 2021. Retrieved 15 May 2021.
 Apples and Honey Wimbledon: The Nursery on The Common

1949 establishments in England
1997 establishments in England
Buildings and structures in Wimbledon, London
Homeless shelters in the United Kingdom
Jewish organizations established in 1949
Putney
Reform synagogues in the United Kingdom
Religion in the London Borough of Wandsworth
Religious buildings and structures in the London Borough of Merton
Synagogues completed in 1953
Synagogues completed in 1997
Synagogues in London
University of Roehampton